Alejandro Silva may refer to:

 Alejandro Silva (musician), Chilean heavy metal guitarist
 Alejandro Silva (athlete) (born 1958), retired long-distance runner from Chile
 Alejandro Silva (boxer) (born 1957), Puerto Rican boxer
 Alejandro Silva (footballer) (born 1989), Uruguayan football right-back
 Alejandro Bello Silva (1887–1914), Chilean aviator
 Alejandro da Silva (born 1983), Paraguayan footballer striker